The Parson Capen House is a historic house in Topsfield, Massachusetts, that was built in 1683. It has drawn attention as an example of early colonial architecture and due to its well-preserved condition compared to other houses built at that time.

History
The Capen house was built on a  lot in 1683 as the parsonage for the local Congregational Church. It is located at what is now 1 Howlett Street, next to the Topsfield Common. It was first owned by the Reverend Joseph Capen, who had moved to Topsfield from Dorchester. His wife had seen the previous parsonage and was disappointed by its condition. The family lived there for over forty years. At the time that it was built, it was considered to be the best house in the town.

The house was declared a National Historic Landmark in 1960. It is one of the best preserved homes from its period in New England. The Topsfield Historical Society currently operates it as a historic house museum.

Architecture
The Capen house was built with English style architecture, and it bears a strong resemblance to many houses in England.

The house features overhangs called jetties at the front and sides, but not the rear, of the building. Although many have assumed that the overhangs were intended as protection from Native Americans, they were primarily decorative and also served to shield people from rain. The house has a small entrance hallway leading to the staircase. It contains four rooms, each of which contains a fireplace. It has exposed low ceilings with wooden beams.

Hanging wood pendills, ornaments that were carved by the carpenter who built the house, were also used as decoration.

See also
 List of historic houses in Massachusetts
 List of the oldest buildings in Massachusetts
 National Register of Historic Places listings in Essex County, Massachusetts
 List of National Historic Landmarks in Massachusetts

References

Bibliography

External links
 Topsfield Historical Society
 National Park Service

Houses completed in 1694
Historic house museums in Massachusetts
National Historic Landmarks in Massachusetts
Museums in Essex County, Massachusetts
Houses in Topsfield, Massachusetts
Houses on the National Register of Historic Places in Essex County, Massachusetts
1694 establishments in Massachusetts
Historic district contributing properties in Massachusetts